Alice blue is a pale tint of azure that was favored by Alice Roosevelt Longworth, American painter and daughter of Theodore Roosevelt, which sparked a fashion sensation in the United States.

The hit song "Alice Blue Gown", inspired by Longworth's signature gown, premiered in Harry Tierney's 1919 Broadway musical Irene. The musical was made into a film in 1940 starring Anna Neagle and Ray Milland.

The color is specified by the United States Navy for use in insignia and trim on the USS Theodore Roosevelt. "AliceBlue" is also one of the original 1987 X11 color names which became the basis for color description in web authoring.

This particular shade of blue is also referred as white-blue (or blue-white) and ice/icy blue, due to its very pale coloration which includes a hint of green—as does actual ice.

References 

Shades of azure
Shades of blue
Shades of cyan
Theodore Roosevelt